P. K. Medini is a revolutionary singer, musician, stage artist, one of the few living freedom fighters of India, a participant of the historical Punnapra-Vayalar uprising, a leader of Communist party of India and a renowned social activist of Kerala.

Medini is a recipient of the Kerala Sangeetha Nataka Akademi Award (1999).

References

External links

 

Communist Party of India politicians from Kerala

Living people
Actresses in Malayalam theatre
Female politicians of the Communist Party of India
Activists from Kerala
Women in Kerala politics
Singers from Kerala
Indian women folk singers
20th-century Indian singers
21st-century Indian singers
20th-century Indian women politicians
21st-century Indian women politicians
20th-century Indian politicians
21st-century Indian politicians
Women musicians from Kerala
20th-century Indian women singers
21st-century Indian women singers
Politicians from Alappuzha
Musicians from Alappuzha
Year of birth missing (living people)
Recipients of the Kerala Sangeetha Nataka Akademi Award